Indiano Bridge (Ponte all'Indiano in Italian) is the first earth-anchored cable-stayed bridge in the world. It is a bridge across the Arno River in Florence (Italy) (near the Indian Monument of
Rajaram II
.

The bridge was built between 1972 and 1978 by Società C.M.F. S.p.A. with architectural and urban architects Adriano Montemagni and Paolo Sica, and structural design engineer Fabrizio de Miranda.

The project won the national competition organized by the Municipality of Florence in 1968, and immediately attracted attention because it involved a pedestrian bridge hanging below. For the structural characteristics Fabrizio de Miranda in 1978 received the European award-CECM ECCS (European Convention for Construction Metallica). In fact it is the first cable-stayed bridge of large span anchored to the ground made the world and is one of the largest cable-stayed bridges in Italy of the twentieth century.

Key facts
Owner: Comune di Firenze (Italy)
Contractor: C.M.F. Spa - Guasticce (Livorno - Italy)
Structural design: Prof. Dr. ing. Fabrizio de Miranda (Milan - Italy)
Span: 189 m (620 feet).
Type of bridge: highway, earth anchored cable-stayed bridge with central towers and a steel stiffened plate girder composed of 2 trapezoidal  box-girders connected by a cross-beams and horizontal bracings.

Gallery

References

Fabrizio De Miranda, Ponti a struttura d'acciaio, vol. VII, Collana Italsider, Genova 1971, pp. 301–304.
Fabrizio De Miranda, Il ponte strallato sull'Arno a Firenze in località l'Indiano, in "Costruzioni Metalliche" n. 6/1978.
Santini P.C., Il ponte dell'indiano a Firenze, "Ottagono", n. 52/1979.
Fabrizio De Miranda, I ponti strallati di grande luce, fondamenti teorici, analisi strutturale, criteri di progettazione, tecniche di costruzione, 5 esempi di realizzazioni, Ed. Cremonese, Roma 1980 (Zanichelli BO), pp. 246–258.
Gobbi G., Itinerari di Firenze moderna, Firenze 1987.
Sica P., Scritti e progetti per Firenze: 1963-1988, Venezia 1989.
AA.VV., Firenze. Guida di architettura, Torino 1992.
Andreini L., Ponte all'Indiano a Firenze, in "Rassegna di Architettura e Urbanistica", 117, pp. 127–134,Roma 2005.

External links

flickr photos

Bridges completed in 1977
Cable-stayed bridges in Italy
Bridges in Florence